.london is a top-level domain (TLD) for London, England. It was approved by ICANN as a city-level TLD on 7 June 2013. On 29 April 2014, the domain name went on sale for the first time. London and Partners, which promotes the city, said that .london would carry a premium because of its exclusivity.

References

Sponsored top-level domains
Domain names of the United Kingdom
Mass media in London
Computer-related introductions in 2014
2014 establishments in the United Kingdom